Assia Zouhair (born 30 April 1991) is a Moroccan footballer who plays as a goalkeeper for Chabab Atlas Khénifra and the Morocco women's national team.

Club career
Zouhair has played for CAK in Morocco.

International career
Zouhair has capped for Morocco at senior level.

See also
List of Morocco women's international footballers

References

External links

1991 births
Living people
Moroccan women's footballers
Women's association football goalkeepers
Morocco women's international footballers